Rosa Parks Highway or Rosa Parks Freeway may refer to:
A section of Interstate 55 in Missouri
A section of Interstate 96 in Detroit, Michigan
A section of Interstate 10 in Los Angeles, California
A section of State Route 58 in Bakersfield, California
Interstate 475 (Ohio)